Tongkang LRT station (SW7) is an elevated Light Rail Transit (LRT) station on the Sengkang LRT line West Loop in Anchorvale, Sengkang, Singapore, located at Sengkang East Avenue near the junction of Anchorvale Road. It was opened on 29 January 2005 together with the Punggol LRT East Loop.

Etymology
The station's name refers to tongkang (Malay for "bumboat" or "lighter"), which was derived from a Malay village that existed southwards, Kampong Tongkang Pechah. It was a light boat that was once used for riverine cargo transport, and was named as such as the area was located in used to be closely related with maritime activities.

References

Railway stations in Singapore opened in 2005
LRT stations in Sengkang
Anchorvale
Light Rail Transit (Singapore) stations